Isabela Yolanda Moner (born July 10, 2001), known professionally as Isabela Merced since 2019, is an American actress and singer. She played the lead role of CJ Martin on the Nickelodeon television series 100 Things to Do Before High School (2014–2016) and voiced Kate in Nickelodeon's animated spinoff series Dora and Friends: Into the City! (2014–2017). In film, she has played Izabella in Transformers: The Last Knight (2017), Lizzy in Instant Family (2018), Isabel in Sicario: Day of the Soldado (2018), the titular character in Dora and the Lost City of Gold (2019), and Rachel Cooper in the Netflix film Sweet Girl (2021).

Early life and education
Merced was born in Cleveland, Ohio. She is the daughter of Katherine, who was born in Lima, Peru, and Patrick Moner, who was born in Louisiana. Merced has stated that Spanish was her first language, and she struggled with English when she first started grade school, adding that she considers herself more Peruvian than American. At age 15, she was accepted into college.

Merced began acting after her family's Cleveland home was destroyed by a fire. Merced was a Judy Garland fan, so her parents, wanting to distract her from the loss, asked her if she wanted to audition for a local production of The Wizard of Oz. She agreed and was cast as a Munchkin. A local theatre director urged the family to relocate to New York City, which they did, to help her pursue a career on Broadway.

Career
Merced has said that she wanted to be an actress from a very young age, inspired by movies featuring Shirley Temple and Judy Garland and starting in local community theatre at age six. Merced made her Broadway debut at age ten in a production of Evita, in which she sang in Spanish with Ricky Martin. She released an album produced by Broadway Records in September 2015, entitled Stopping Time.

Merced's first starring performance was as CJ Martin, the lead role on the Nickelodeon television series 100 Things to Do Before High School, from 2014 to 2016. That same year, she began providing the voice of Kate, one of the main characters in the Dora the Explorer spinoff, Dora and Friends: Into the City!, a role she performed from 2014 to 2017. In 2015, she appeared as Lori Collins in the Nickelodeon Original Movie Splitting Adam, and was cast as Sadie, one of the leading roles, in the 2016 Nickelodeon Original Movie Legends of the Hidden Temple. In May 2016, Merced was cast in the film Transformers: The Last Knight, which was released in June 2017. She voiced Heather in the animated film The Nut Job 2: Nutty by Nature, which was theatrically released on August 11, 2017.

In 2018, Merced had a "major" role in Sicario: Day of the Soldado, playing the daughter of a drug cartel head, in a performance lauded by critics. The New Yorker'''s Anthony Lane wrote "Moner is terrific, and her character’s fortunes can be read in her eyes—blazing to begin with, as she scraps with another girl in a schoolyard, but dark and blank by the end, their youthful fire doused by the violence that she has seen."

In the same year, she played the adopted daughter of the characters played by Mark Wahlberg and Rose Byrne in the comedy film Instant Family, for which she also wrote and sang the song "I'll Stay".Instant Family (2018), Soundtrack.net In 2019, Merced starred as the title character in Dora and the Lost City of Gold, a live action film adaptation of the animated series, and was cast in the Christmas romantic comedy ensemble film Let It Snow. The same year, she was cast opposite Jason Momoa in the film Sweet Girl for Netflix.

On October 14, 2019, Merced announced to her fans via a post on her Instagram account that she had decided to change her stage name to Isabela Merced, in memory of her late grandmother whom she never met. Merced later explained that she had not legally changed her name and said that it was "just a stage name but it's got a deeper meaning". Her first single, "Papi", was released on October 25, 2019, followed by her first music video released on November 6, 2019. On May 22, 2020, Merced released her debut EP, The Better Half of Me; and was named one of Billboard's top 15 new Peruvian artists to listen to in July 2020.

In March 2022, it was announced Merced would star in Turtles All the Way Down'', a film adaptation of the 2017 novel by John Green, which began filming in April 2022. Merced is to join the cast of Fede Álvarez's Alien film.

Filmography

Awards and nominations

References

External links

 
 

2001 births
Living people
21st-century American actresses
21st-century American singers
21st-century American women singers
Actresses from Cleveland
American child actresses
American film actresses
American people of Peruvian descent
American television actresses
American video game actresses
Hispanic and Latino American actresses
Hispanic and Latino American women singers
Republic Records artists
Musicians from Cleveland
Singers from Ohio